The Headies 2020 was the 14th edition of The Headies, a Nigerian music awards show held to recognize outstanding achievements in the Nigerian music industry. The ceremony took place on February 21, 2021 due to the effects of the COVID-19 pandemic instead of December 2020, the usual month for the awards. It was held at the La Campagne Tropicana Beach Resort in  Ibeju-Lekki

The organizers of the event announced TV personality and actress Nancy Isime and comedian Bovi as hosts, this made it the fourth time Bovi will host the event, while Nancy became the first female to host the event for the second time.

The nominees were announced on 4 December 2020 with Fireboy DML leading with nine nominations. Davido and Wurld followed with seven nominations each, while Burna boy the reigning Artiste of the Year secured six nominations.

This year's award rewarded  works released between July 2019 and September 2020, this year's award and saw the inclusion of a new category named the Songwriter of the Year to bring to the limelight hardworking individuals who have all significantly supported the creation of quality music.

Timaya, alongside rapper and activist Eedris Abdulkareem  received special recognition awards for their impact on the music industry. The main event also saw Jùjú legend King Sunny Ade inducted into the Headies Hall of Fame.

Fireboy DML had the highest award winnings for Headies awards 2020 by securing 4 awards.

Performances

Presenters

 Iyabo Ojo and Mai Atafo - Best R&B Single
Oye Akindeinde - Best recording of the year
 Nedu - Best Music Video
 Trevor Henry - Producer of the year
Opeyemi Awojobi -  Best vocal performance (female)
 Simi Drey and Osi Suave - Best vocal performance (male)
 Omotunde Bamigbade - Best street hop artiste 
Eniola Badmus and Masterkraft - Rookie of the year 
Kim Oprah and Broda Shaggi - Best pop single  
Laycon and Vee - Best alternative song  
Lilian Afegbai - Best rap single  
Yinka Adebayo - Best R&B album  
Idia Aisien and Ayo Makun - Best alternative album  
Ayo Makun and Erica Nlewedim - Revelation of the year

Winners and nominees
Below list are nominees.

References

2020 music awards
2021 music awards
The Headies